Major Charles Dawson Booker  (sometimes hyphenated into Dawson-Booker) (21 April 1897 – 13 August 1918) was an English World War I fighter ace credited with 29 victories. He was promoted to high rank while relatively young as a result of his gallantry and unswerving dedication to his country.

Early life
Charles Dawson Booker was born to Joseph Dawson and Rachel C. Booker at Burnt House Cottage, Speldhurst, Royal Tunbridge Wells, Kent, England. He spent part of his youth in Australia, attending the Grammar School in Melbourne from February 1908 through December 1911. He then returned to England and attended Bedford School until May 1915. On 8 September 1915, he was accepted into the Royal Naval Air Service as a Flight Sub-Lieutenant.

First tour of service
He served on the Belgian Coast, first with 5 Naval Wing, then with 8 Naval Squadron from May through October 1916, and further inland for another year, through November 1917. He did not open his victory roll until 23 January 1917, after his transfer to 8 Naval, when he drove an Albatros D.III down out of control while piloting a Sopwith Pup.

After a lapse of some months, he used a Sopwith Triplane to score four times in April, becoming an ace on the 30th. Even at this early stage, he was flight commander of C Flight despite his youth. He was described by one of his wingmen as "...a little fellow, usually very silent, who fears nothing, but he would run a mile from any girl....he hopes the war will go on forever because he loves air fighting, and if the war were to end he is afraid he might not be able to find a suitable job."

May was an especially notable month for Booker, with nine victories, including a triple on the 24th.

On 22 June, after his 17th win, he was awarded the Distinguished Service Cross; the citation noted his three wins tallied on 24 May.

After three victories in July, he shot down and badly wounded German ace Hauptmann Adolf Ritter von Tutschek, commander of Jasta 12, on 11 August 1917; Tutschek would take half a year to recover. In this same fight, Booker was so badly shot about that German ace Viktor Schobinger claimed Booker as a victory. Booker actually managed to coax his destroyed 'Tripehound' to a forced landing in friendly territory. He had used Sopwith Triplanes (his usual aircraft being serial number N5482, which he whimsically dubbed 'Maude') to run his string of triumphs to 23 by this time. The crash landing on the 11th was the end of 'Maude'. It had been his mount for at least 14 triumphs.

On 27 September, he scored his first victory while flying a Sopwith Camel; he shot down German ace Oberleutnant Hans Waldhausen of Jasta 37, who became a prisoner.

However, Naval 8, and Booker, were withdrawn from action in November and returned to England. Booker was the fourth ranked of the 25 aces in this prestigious squadron.

Second tour of service
After some months back in England, he returned to France as a Major commanding 201 Squadron of the newly formed Royal Air Force. He had been given the command in March, just shy of his 21st birthday. Once again, he would be flying a Camel.

He led 201 by example, scoring two May victories and one in July. In May, on the 27th, he identified the body of his friend, Australian ace Robert Little, who had been shot down nearby.

On 13 August 1918, he was leading a rookie pilot on an orientation tour of their aerial battlefield. The two Camel pilots ran into a formation of at least six expert pilots from Jagdgeschwader 2. Booker tackled them single-handedly to cover the green pilot's retreat. It was the greenhorn who verified Booker's final three wins. However, Jasta 12's ace Leutnant Ulrich Neckel finally shot Booker down.

Booker was buried in Vignacourt British Cemetery, Somme, France.

He had claimed 29 victories; he shared in the capture of two enemy airplanes; destroyed ten, including six victories shared with other pilots; and drove down 17 'out of control', including five shared wins.

Awards
Distinguished Service Cross

Charles Dawson Booker was also awarded the Croix de guerre on 14 July 1917.

References

Bibliography
 
 
 
  
 
 

1897 births
1918 deaths
Military personnel from Kent
Burials in France
Royal Naval Air Service personnel of World War I
British military personnel killed in World War I
British World War I flying aces
Recipients of the Distinguished Service Cross (United Kingdom)
Recipients of the Croix de Guerre 1914–1918 (France)
Royal Air Force officers
People from Royal Tunbridge Wells
People educated at Bedford School